Exempt property, under the law of property in many jurisdictions, is property that can neither be passed by will nor claimed by creditors of the deceased in the event that a decedent leaves a surviving spouse or surviving descendants. Typically, exempt property includes a family car, and a certain amount of cash (perhaps $10,000-$20,000), or the equivalent value in personal property.

Exempt property calculations and provisions are determined on a state-by-state basis.  This is important within the bankruptcy process, and may affect an individual's decision to file Chapter 7 or Chapter 13 bankruptcy.  State exemptions vary from strict to generous.  For example, Texas is more lenient in allowing your homestead and up to $60,000 in personal property. Texas also exempts certain investments and insurance policies. Other states, such as Arizona, are more strict and may exempt only $150 in a checking account comparatively speaking. Even further, other states have more moderate policies, with California's homestead exemption law providing between $300,000 to $600,000 of exempt equity in a homestead, depending on the county where the debtor is located.

References

Property law
Wills and trusts